The 1964 South Dakota gubernatorial election was held on November 3, 1964.

Incumbent Republican Governor Archie M. Gubbrud did not run for re-election.

Republican nominee Nils Boe defeated Democratic nominee John F. Lindley with 51.68% of the vote.

Primary elections
Primary elections were held on June 2, 1964.

Democratic primary

Candidates
John F. Lindley, former Lieutenant Governor
Merton B. Tice, unsuccessful candidate for Democratic nomination for 1956 United States Senate election in South Dakota

Results

Republican primary

Candidates
Nils Boe, incumbent Lieutenant Governor
Sigurd Anderson, former Governor

Results

General election

Candidates
John F. Lindley, Democratic
Nils Boe, Republican

Results

References

Bibliography
 
 

1964
South Dakota
Gubernatorial
November 1964 events in the United States